Stolas may refer to:
Stolas (demon), a demon in the Ars Goetia
Stolas Goetia, a character in the adult animated web series Helluva Boss, inspired by the Goetic demon
Stolas (band), an American post-hardcore band
Stolas: Book of Angels Volume 12, a 2009 Masada Quintet album
Stolas (beetle), a genus of beetles in the family Chrysomelidae

Persons with the name
Alexander Stølås (born 1989), Norwegian footballer

See also
Stola (disambiguation)